Järvenpää Mosque is a mosque located in the Finnish town of Järvenpää. It is owned by The Finnish-Islamic Congregation, which members are Finnish Tatars. It was built in the 1940s. The Tatar community together raised the money for it.

In the 1980s in the mosque, Tatars still arranged language and religious teaching for the children of the community. Later, most of the activity has been centered around a few religious occasions, such as Ramadan.

Around the time the Järvenpää mosque was built, a separate Islamic congregation was founded in Tampere by local Tatars.

They practice Sunni Islam.

See also
 Islam in Finland
Tatars
The Finnish-Islamic Congregation

External links 
 Изге мирас - Documentary on the Järvenpää Tatar community

References

Finnish Tatars
Mosques in Finland
Järvenpää
Mosques completed in 1942
1942 establishments in Finland